Alfred-Alphonse Bottiau (6 February 1889 – 25 February 1951) was a French sculptor.  He was born in Valenciennes  and after early studies in his home town he studied in Paris under Jean Antoine Injalbert and was runner-up for the Prix de Rome for sculpture in 1919. Bottiau had joined the army in 1910 and served until 1919. He was director of the Écoles Académiques de Valenciennes from 1946 to 1951.

Commissioned works

Chateau-Thierry American Monument 
Bottiau often worked with the architect Paul Philippe Cret and together they carried out several commissions for the American Battle Monuments Commission. One such commission was the Chateau-Thierry American Monument which lies southeast of the Aisne-Marne American Cemetery. Bottiau was the sculptor of the two enormous figures representing France and the United States, which adorn the west face of this monument. This monument is known as the "Monument de la Côté 204" and it was erected to celebrate the role played by U.S soldiers in this sector in July 1918 during the Second Battle of the Marne. It was inaugurated in 1930. An enormous eagle and shield stand in front of the east face of the monument and although this has not been established to be the case, this could also be the work of Bottiau, as he worked with Cret in Philadelphia and was the sculptor of the eagle and allegorical reliefs on the Federal Reserve Bank of Philadelphia building there.  Bottiau had travelled to the United States in 1932 and worked on several commissions in that country.

Memorial Chapel in Belleau 

Bottiaux also worked on the Memorial Chapel in the Aisne-Marne American Cemetery. This cemetery covers those deaths incurred in the Aisne-Marne offensive which took place from May to October 1918. The cemetery holds 2,289 graves, among which are 250 soldiers whose remains could not be identified. Most of the deaths occurred during the Second Battle of the Marne. Another 1,060 men died but their remains were never found and their names are recorded on the walls of the Memorial Chapel.  This Memorial Chapel was erected over front line trenches dug by the American Army's 2nd Division as part of the defence of Belleau Wood. Bottiau carried out the chapel's decorative embellishments to the design of William F.Ross and Company of East Cambridge in Massachusetts.

Bottiau's work on the Memorial Chapel includes the relief in the tympanum above the chapel entrance. In the centre of Bottiau's composition is a crusader in armour, the defender of "Right", and on either side of this crusader are the shields of the United States and France, these being intertwined with branches of oak, a symbol of the traditional unity of the two countries.

On the capitals of the three columns on either side of the entrance to this Memorial Chapel are carvings by Bottiau which depict scenes from the trenches. On the right hand side are a group of soldiers preparing for a bayonet charge, some riflemen with automatic rifles and a further group of riflemen with non-automatic weapons. On the left hand side we have some artillery observers, a machine gun crew and soldiers launching grenades.

Bottiau also carried out eleven carvings on the capitals of the belfry columns, these representing the various units involved in the war.  Bayonets represent the Infantry, Cannon the Artillery, Tanks represent the Tank Corps, Crossed Heavy Machine Guns the Machine Gun Units. We then have propellers representing Aviation units and artillery rounds for both the Artillery and Ordnance. The Engineers are represented by a plane-table, the Medics by a Greek Cross and Caduceus . Airplane engines represent Aviation repair units and a mule's head over which is engraved "8 Chev" the Transport units, the "Chev 8" being the French railway boxcar used to transport 40 men or 8 horses. Finally oak leaves represent the Judge Advocate General Corps. These carvings appear again in groups of seven on each side of the chapel. On the north face is a mule's head, bayonets, a plane-table, crossed machine guns, Greek cross and caduceus, airplane engines and cannon, on the south face the grouping is a plane table, crossed machine guns, oak leaves,  Greek cross and caduceus, cannon, propellers and tanks. On the west face the grouping is artillery rounds, bayonets, plane-table, airplane engines, cannon, propellers and tanks and on the east face the grouping covers artillery rounds, mule's head, bayonets, oak leaves, Greek cross and caduceus, cannon, propellers and tanks.

The arches of the belfry openings carry carvings of small arms ammunition, the front view of a machine gun and projectile, field packs with entrenching tools attached and selected officer and enlisted insignia.  Engraved on the sills are orientation arrows with distances to points of historic interest.

Finally below the belfry openings are sculptured heads representing some of the men and women who served in the Allied armed forces. We have a French soldier, a French nurse, an American aviator, a Scottish soldier, a Russian soldier, a Portuguese soldier, a Canadian aviator, and a British Women's Army Corps driver. The same heads appear on each side of the chapel but in a different order.

Meuse-Argonne Memorial 

Bottiau also carried out work in the Meuse-Argonne American Cemetery and Memorial. The cemetery stands on ground taken from the Germans in 1918 by the 32nd Infantry Division. There is a chapel in the cemetery and Bottiau carved the bas-relief in the tympanum above the chapel's entrance. The composition shows two kneeling figures representing "Grief" and "Remembrance" and on the lintel underneath are the words "IN SACRED SLEEP THEY REST". Alongside the entrance door carved heads of American soldiers appear on the column capitals.

We can see another example of Bottiau and Cret's cooperation in the Flanders Field American Cemetery and Memorial. Cret was the architect of the cemetery and memorial and Bottiau's work can be seen particularly on the Memorial Chapel's walls. This cemetery is situated where the U.S.91st Division suffered many casualties in October/November 1918.

There is also incidentally a memorial in Belleau Wood itself to the 4th Marine Brigade of the 2nd Division which was primarily responsible for the capture of the wood. The memorial features a life-size bronze bas-relief by Felix de Weldon. It was de Weldon who was the sculptor of the iconic memorial at Iwo-Jima.

Bellicourt Monument 
Another Cret/Bottiaux co-operation with the American Battle Memorial Commission involves the Bellicourt American Monument which stands near to the Somme American Cemetery.  The memorial commemorates the troops of the United States who fought in France during 1917 and 1918. The monument was erected above a canal tunnel which was one of the main defence features of the German Army's "Hindenburg Line" a line broken by American troops in their September 1918 offensive. The monument comprises a large rectangular stone block standing on a two-stepped terrace. On the eastern face are two bas-relief figures carved by Bottiau. One represents "Valour" and the other "Remembrance". An American flag is in the centre of the composition topped by an eagle. The monument was dedicated on 9 August 1937.

Bottiau also worked on the Mondemont monument celebrating the First Battle of the Marne. Henri Bouchard was the sculptor chosen for the figure of "Victory", the main feature of this remarkable monument but the bas reliefs at the base of the monument were a work of cooperation between Alfred Bottiau and two other sculptors Albert Patrisse and René André Duparc.

Other works

See also 
 American Battle Monuments Commission
 Paul Philippe Cret
 Felix de Weldon

Notes and references

External links 
Monument commemorating The First Battle of the Marne
 Mondemont monument
The Aisne-Marne American Cemetery - Belleau Wood monument

French architectural sculptors
1889 births
1951 deaths
People from Valenciennes
20th-century French sculptors
20th-century French male artists
French male sculptors
Prix de Rome for sculpture